The Stars Are Singing is a 1953 Paramount Pictures musical directed by Norman Taurog and starring Rosemary Clooney, Anna Maria Alberghetti, and Lauritz Melchior.

Plot
The screenplay concerns a 15-year-old Polish girl (played by Alberghetti) who attempts to enter the U.S. illegally, setting off a major search by immigration officials. She is befriended by a struggling group of New York performers, who try to get approval for her to remain in the country.

Clooney performs her hit song "Come On-a My House" and Danish tenor Lauritz Melchior sings "Vesti la giubba" from Leoncavallo's opera Pagliacci in this Technicolor production.

Production 
The film cost $1,264,337 and earned an estimated $1.6 million at the North American box office in 1953.

Release 
The film's world premier was in Clooney's home town, Maysville, Kentucky, at the Russell Theatre.

Cast
 Rosemary Clooney as Terry Brennan
 Anna Maria Alberghetti as Katri Walenska
 Lauritz Melchior as Jan Poldi
 Bob Williams as Homer Tirdell
 Tom Morton as Buddy Fraser
 Fred Clark as McDougall
 John Archer as Dave Parish
 Mikhail Rasumny as Ladowski
 Lloyd Corrigan as Miller
 Don Wilson as Radio Announcer
 Otto Waldis as Ship's Captain Goslak
 Henry Guttman as Ship's Mate
 Paul E. Burns as Henryk
 Freeman Lusk as Conway

References

External links

1953 films
1953 musical comedy films
American musical comedy films
1950s English-language films
Films scored by Victor Young
Films about singers
Films directed by Norman Taurog
Films set in New York City
Paramount Pictures films
1950s American films
Films about immigration to the United States